Ayios Dhometios ( or) is a suburb located west of the Cypriot capital Nicosia. It has a population of 12,456 (2011 census) making it one of Cyprus's biggest municipalities. There is also a population of 2,314 (in 2011) within the area of Ayios Dhometios under Turkish control.

Since 2003 and the opening of the border, Ayios Dhometios is the site of the island's most important checkpoint in Cyprus, through which thousands of Greek Cypriots and Turkish Cypriots pass over the line every day.

History

Ayios Dhometios, has existed since ancient times as a small village, located 4 kilometres west of Nicosia. Mention of Ayios Dhometios comes from as early as the Franks era (Lusignan Period 1191–1489). The town is named after St. Dometios of Persia who originated from Persia in the 4th century AD and who became Christian later in his life. He lived in a cave in Mesopotamia and converted many people into Christianity. Roman Emperor Julian the Apostate accused Dhometios of tricking people, so Dhometios answered the Emperor that all of these harmless people visit him freely and he cannot just send them away. Julian the Apostate felt offended by his answer and ordered his death. Dhometios was stoned to death at 362 AD. The church of Ayios Dhometios was built in the 17th century and is dedicated to the Saint. It's built on a small hill and is one of the town's main attractions.

At the first British census in 1881, the population was 430. This had grown to 10,055 at independence in 1960, including Greek 7,672, Maronite 73, Armenian 66, Turkish 1,British 2,065.

Ayios Pavlos

The parish of Ayios Pavlos is located around the church of Saint Paul. The Ayios Dhometios junior high school is also located in Ayios Pavlos. It is also considered an area within Ayios Dhometios, covering its northern area.

Administration

Ayios Dhometios has been a municipality since 1986 and the mayor is elected directly by the people in mayor elections that take place every five years. The elections of December 17, 2006 saw mayor Dr. Andreas Hadjiloizou get re-elected into office. He was elected into office in 1996 and re-elected in 2001. Mr Costas Petrou is the current mayor after defeating Dr. Andreas Hadjiloizou in the December 2011 elections.

The part of Ayios Dhometios (known as Aydemet or Metehan in Turkish) under Turkish control is currently administered as a Mahalla or neighbourhood of the  Nicosia Turkish Municipality.

Ayios Dhometios is divided into the civil parishes or neighbourhoods of St. George and St. Paul. 
Their populations in 2011 were St. Paul: 3,189 and St. George: 9,267.

The Koinotarch (communal president) of St. George is Christodoulos Ioannou (since 2015) and that of St. Paul is Stavros Xyrichis (since 2018).

Interconnectors
In Ayios Dometios are headquarters of EuroAsia Interconnector, EuroAfrica Interconnector, Quantum Cable, Quantum Corporation and Quantum Energy. The  EuroAsia Interconnector is a 2000 MW electricity interconnector between Greek, Cypriot, and Israeli power grids via 1520 km long submarine power cable. EuroAfrica Interconnector is 2000 MW interconnector between Greek, Cypriot, and Egypt's power grids via 1710 km long submarine power cable. Quantum Cable is 7,700 km submarine communications cable system connecting Asia with Europe through the Mediterranean sea. It connects Cyprus, Greece, Israel, Italy, France and Spain.

Interesting sites

Ayios Dhometios checkpoint
The opening of the buffer zone between the Republic of Cyprus and the Turkish Republic of Northern Cyprus in April 2003 set up debate about opening some additional checkpoints both for cars and on foot along the Green Line. One of the areas selected was the end of Demokratias avenue in Ayios Dhometios. Finally, an agreement was reached and in late April 2004 both sides started separate works building a road and placing control buildings. On May 23, 2004, the checkpoint opened to the public, and on the first day thousands of Greek and Turkish Cypriots, on both sides passed through the check point. Since then, Ayios Dhometios has become the main  passing point for vehicles, with thousands of Greek and Turkish Cypriots passing through every day.

Churches

Ayios Dhometios is currently home of three Christian-Orthodox churches. The Ayios (Saint) Dhometios church is the oldest of the three and is built on a hill overlooking the old part of town.
The Saint George church is located on Gregoris Afxentiou Avenue and is Ayios Dhometios's main church. It's dedicated to Saint George who according to the legend slaughtered a dragon with a spear.
The third church of the town is Saint Paul's church and is the newest of the three. It was built in the 1990s to replace the ageing church situated next to it which is dedicated to the same saint.

The Cyprus Institute of Neurology and Genetics
The Cyprus Institute of Neurology and Genetics is also located in Ayios Dhometios on the Kolokassides roundabout.

Coca-Cola factory
The island's Coca-Cola factory is located in Ayios Dhometios, on the edge of the Engomi industrial area. Lanitis juices and milk products are also produced in the factories compound.

Parks
Ayios Dhometios has four parks. The Missing in Action park, which is dedicated to the Ayios Dhometios residents that went missing during the Turkish Invasion and are still MIA and is located opposite the Coca-Cola factory, the Ayios Dhometios park which is located near the checkpoint into the occupied area, the Ayios Pavlos park which is near the Junior High and the newest built park which is dedicated to the National Guard, and is also near the Junior High.

Old Ayios Dhometios 
Part of Ayios Dhometios is preserved to its old appearance. It is still an inhabited, and fully functional neighborhood. It has beautiful characteristic Cypriot architecture including the traditional old doors, and colored windows.

Education

Ayios Dhometios has three elementary schools and one junior high school. The 1st elementary, located opposite the Saint Dhometios church, is the oldest and was built during the British rule of the island. Prior to the invasion, a fourth elementary school existed and shared building facilities with the junior high school. A new building for the junior high was being built and was ready in June 1974, but the Turkish troops took control of the new building a month later.

Demographics

Agios Dhometios is one of Nicosia's intensively populated districts with a diverse mixture of cultures. Despite its historic Greek-Cypriot community, Agios Dhometios is home to Nicosia's largest Pontic Greek community which operates a number of shops, restaurants, political clubs and entertainment centers. Agios Dhometios is also largely populated by residents from former Soviet countries with a solid Russian-speaking community, therefore it is easy to see a number of Russian supermarkets such as Nastinka and Mini Mix, kiosks, bakeries. There are over 200 Armenians living in Agios Dhometios, both Cypriot Armenians and Armenian immigrants from the former Soviet Union and Armenia in particular, giving a unique sense to the community through its taverns with Armenian cuisine.

Sports

Nicosia Race Club 
The Nicosia Race Club is the only organization in Cyprus authorized to organize horse races in Cyprus. Races are organized on Sundays and most Wednesdays in winter and spring and on Wednesdays and most Saturdays in the Summer and Fall.

Athletes
Ayios Dhometios has a long tradition in sporting events. Some of the countries best athletes originate from the towns many sporting clubs. George Anastasiades, current captain of the National Basketball Team; Christos Stylianides, all time legend of Cyprus basketball and Yiannos Ioannou, former captain of the National Football Team all come from Ayios Dhometios. Dometia and Maria Ioannou, the country's two best female Badminton athletes also live in Ayios Dhometios.

Teams

ENAD Ayios Dhometios
ENAD was created in 1937 and is one of Nicosia's leading Basketball clubs. They have won two Cyprus championships (1969, 1990) and one Cyprus cup (1987) while the team also used to maintain a football team and a volleyball team. ENAD decided to focus on basketball so they suspended all other activities. During the 2005–06 basketball season, ENAD finished second in the regular season, in their best run in the last ten years, but were eliminated by champions AEL in the semi-finals. Marios Argyrou took over before the 2008–09 season as head coach of the team and returned prior to the 2010–11 season, after winning the title as assistant coach at APOEL. The teams' club house is located on Gregoris Afxentiou Avenue.

Mavrommatis Ayios Pavlos
A handball and table tennis club, Mavrommatis has a good appearance in those above sports. One of Cyprus' best teams in table tennis, Mavrommatis also gained promotion to the Cyprus Handball top division after a great presence in the second division of the 2004–05 season. During the 2005–06 season Mavrommatis played great handball and managed to stay in the top division, although many tipped them for relegation.

EAS Ayios Dhometios
Cyprus' major sport is football and Ayios Dhometios has a team in that sport also. EAS plays in the amateur ranks of the Nicosia league and almost won promotion to the Cyprus fourth division a few seasons back but failed in the play-offs. EAS also maintains an indoor football team that plays in Cyprus' third division but is tipped for promotion in the 2006–07 season. EAS' cycling team is also one of the countries elite.

Stadiums
Ayios Dhometios has two main stadiums in which the municipality's teams compete. The football stadium is located next to the 1st elementary and seats 1000 fans. It's a gravel pitch and is not in very good condition.
The basketball arena or municipal stadium is located in the westernmost part of the town, near the 3rd elementary school. It seats 1500 fans, but the record is 4000 fans during the 1990 basketball finals, where ENAD won the championship. It recently went through a facelift with the addition of a modern wooden parquet floor. It is home court for ENAD basketball, Mavrommatis handball and EAS indoor football teams.
The Cyprus Sports Authority has decided to build a new indoor arena in Ayios Dhometios, at the site where the municipal stadium is located. The demolition of the municipal stadium was scheduled in mid-2009 but has been postponed.

Olympic torch relay
The 2004 Athens Olympics chose Cyprus as one of the torch destinations during its worldwide tour. As a matter of fact, Cyprus was the last stop before the torch returned to Greece and the only country that the torch remained in for more than one day. On July 8, 2004, the torch came to Ayios Dhometios, and a total of 5 runners, carried it through the town.

Betting in Ayios Dhometios

Horseracing was revived in Cyprus, Ayios Dhometios from the end of the 19th century. However, the tradition of the sport in this country, as evidenced by archaeological findings existing in the Cyprus Museum, is lost in the depth of the Hellenistic period, where we come across horseracing descriptions by Homer and other ancient authors. Horseracing in those days was actually a "sport of kings" who participated in them. When Kings of ancient Salamis of Cyprus died, their horses were buried with them. Horse racing was for the first time entered in the Olympic Games in the 7th century BC.

Ayios Dhometios is dubbed by many as Cyprus betting capital. The presence of the island's horse race track in the municipality brings hefty revenue to the town but also attracts thousands of horse enthusiasts and gamblers during the races. Due to the presence of the race track, tens of betting parlours exist around the town.

Twinned cities
Ayios Dhometios is a twinned city to Ayios Nikolaos, Crete, and Korydallos in Athens.

References

Nicosia
Municipalities in Nicosia District
Suburbs of Nicosia
Border crossings of Cyprus
Border crossings of divided cities
Checkpoints